Inverse psoriasis or flexural psoriasis is a form of psoriasis that selectively, and often exclusively, involves the folds, recesses, and flexor surfaces such as the ears, axillae, groin folds, inframammary folds, navel, intergluteal cleft, penis, and lips.

Diagnosis

Differential diagnosis
Skin conditions which can present with similar signs and symptoms include seborrheic dermatitis, intertrigo, and tinea versicolor.

See also
 Psoriasis
 Skin lesion

References

Psoriasis